Bruno João Morais Aguiar (born 24 February 1981) is a Portuguese former footballer who played as a central midfielder.

After an unsuccessful spell with Benfica, although he contributed to the team's first Primeira Liga title in over one decade, he left the club in 2005, going on to play professionally in Scotland and Cyprus.

Club career

Benfica
Born in Lisbon, Aguiar grew in local S.L. Benfica's youth system, but spent the vast majority of his spell as a senior with their reserves. Additionally, he also served two loans, at Gil Vicente FC – six months – and F.C. Alverca, helping the former farm team return to the Primeira Liga in the second of his two full seasons, after which he returned to his alma mater.

Under Giovanni Trapattoni, hired for the 2004–05 campaign, Aguiar would make all of his appearances for Benfica's main squad, his first being a UEFA Champions League third qualifying round against R.S.C. Anderlecht on 10 August 2004 (1–0 home win, 1–3 aggregate loss). He also contributed with 19 matches (840 minutes) as they won the domestic league for the first time since 1994; after the Italian was replaced by Ronald Koeman, however, he fell out of favour and was released from contract.

Hearts
In January 2006, Aguiar signed for FBK Kaunas, who immediately loaned him to Heart of Midlothian, both clubs being owned by Vladimir Romanov. He made his competitive debut in a 1–2 defeat to Aberdeen in February, and made a further 11 appearances before the end of the season, helping the side finish in second place in the Scottish Premier League and adding the Scottish Cup.

2006–07 did not start so well for Aguiar, as he was sent off in the first leg of Hearts' Champions League third round qualifier against AEK Athens FC, after receiving a second yellow card for throwing the ball away with a 1–0 lead – the Greek utilised their subsequent one-man advantage to win it 2–1. A lengthy eighteen-month injury layoff soon followed for the player, and he made his return to first-team action in October 2008, in the Edinburgh Derby where he scored a free-kick to earn his team a draw; on 9 December he was awarded the Clydesdale Bank Premier League Player of the Month award for the previous month, and ended the 2008–09 season as top scorer in the squad with seven goals.

On 1 June 2009, Hearts confirmed Aguiar's departure following the expiration of his contract, leaving him free to sign with another club. He stated that he had enjoyed his time at the Tynecastle Stadium, with the Scottish Cup victory and second-place finish in the league in 2006 being personal highlights, as well as wishing them the best for the future.

Omonia
A free agent, Aguiar signed for AC Omonia from Cyprus in June 2009. He left five years later at the age of 33 after helping the Nicosia club to five major titles, including the 2009–10 edition of the First Division championship where he appeared in 15 games, scoring once; he subsequently returned to his homeland, and joined Clube Oriental de Lisboa.

In November 2016, shortly after his last team's relegation from the Segunda Liga, Aguiar announced his retirement.

International career
Aguiar was a member of the Portugal under-21 team that finished third at the 2004 UEFA European Championship and qualified for the Athens Olympics, along with several future full internationals such as Hugo Almeida, Bruno Alves, José Bosingwa, Danny, Raul Meireles and Hugo Viana. He did not make, however, the final cut for the latter competition.

Statistics

Club

Honours

Club
Benfica
Primeira Liga: 2004–05
Taça de Portugal: Runner-up: 2004–05
Supertaça Cândido de Oliveira: Runner-up 2004

Hearts
Scottish Cup: 2005–06

Omonia
Cypriot First Division: 2009–10
Cypriot Cup: 2010–11, 2011–12
Cypriot Super Cup: 2010, 2012

Individual
Scottish Premier League: Player of the Month November 2008

References

External links
 
 
 London Hearts profile
 

1981 births
Living people
Footballers from Lisbon
Portuguese footballers
Association football midfielders
Primeira Liga players
Liga Portugal 2 players
Segunda Divisão players
S.L. Benfica B players
S.L. Benfica footballers
Gil Vicente F.C. players
F.C. Alverca players
Clube Oriental de Lisboa players
Scottish Premier League players
Heart of Midlothian F.C. players
Cypriot First Division players
AC Omonia players
Portugal youth international footballers
Portugal under-21 international footballers
Portuguese expatriate footballers
Expatriate footballers in Scotland
Expatriate footballers in Cyprus
Portuguese expatriate sportspeople in Scotland
Portuguese expatriate sportspeople in Cyprus
Portugal B international footballers